WPKG (92.7 FM, "Today's Best Hits") is a radio station broadcasting a hot adult contemporary music format. Licensed to Neillsville, Wisconsin, United States, the station is currently owned by Central Wisconsin Broadcasting, Inc. and features programming from Cumulus Media.

References

External links

PKG
Hot adult contemporary radio stations in the United States
Clark County, Wisconsin